The Northwest Territories of Canada contains 33 official communities.

Communities 
The following are communities recognised by the Government of the Northwest Territories. All of them are also recognized as census subdivisions by Statistics Canada.

Other 
Ndilǫ, (formerly Rainbow Valley, until 1991) part of the Akaitcho Territory Government, and represented by the Yellowknives Dene First Nation.

Other census subdivisions

Other places 

Canol Camp
Discovery
Fort Confidence
Old Fort Providence
Pine Point
Port Radium
Rayrock
Tungsten

Regional populations

See also 
List of cities in Canada
List of municipalities in the Northwest Territories

References

External links
Place names in the NWT